Urophora chejudoensis is a species of tephritid or fruit flies in the genus Urophora of the family Tephritidae.

Distribution
Korea.

References

Urophora
Insects described in 1985
Diptera of Asia